Jan Břečka (born 13 October 1975 in Pardubice) is a Czech sprint canoeist who competed from 1999 to 2006. He won six medals in the C-4 200 m event at the ICF Canoe Sprint World Championships with a gold (2006) and five silvers (1999, 2001, 2002, 2003, 2005).

Břečka also competed at the 2000 Summer Olympics in Sydney, but was eliminated in the semifinal round of both the C-2 500 m and C-2 1000 m events.

References

1975 births
Canoeists at the 2000 Summer Olympics
Czech male canoeists
Living people
Olympic canoeists of the Czech Republic
ICF Canoe Sprint World Championships medalists in Canadian
Sportspeople from Pardubice